María del Pilar Díaz is an Argentine statistician. She is a professor of statistics in the Faculty of Economics at the National University of Córdoba (UNC).

Pilar Díaz completed a bachelor's degree in mathematics at UNC. She earned a master's degree (in 1992) and doctorate in statistics (in 1996) at the University of São Paulo.

References

External links 
 Faculty homepage
 
 Publications listed on CONICET

Living people
Year of birth missing (living people)
Place of birth missing (living people)
Argentine statisticians
20th-century Argentine mathematicians
21st-century women mathematicians
National University of Córdoba alumni
Academic staff of the National University of Córdoba
University of São Paulo alumni
Women statisticians
Biostatisticians